Sarveshwar Dayal Saxena (15 September 1927 – 23 September 1983) was a Hindi writer, poet, columnist and playwright. He was one of the seven poets who
first published in one of the "Tar Saptaks", which ushered in the ‘Prayogvaad’ (Experimentalism) era, which in time evolved to become the "Nayi Kavita" (New Poetry) movement.

Biography
Sarveshwar Dayal Saxena was born on the date 15 September 1927 in Basti a city, in Uttar Pradesh he received his education at Banaras Hindu University, and Allahabad University. Today he is considered a very important political poet. He won the Sahitya Akademi Award for his Poetry collection, Khutiyon Par Tange Log ("People Hanging From Pegs"). His short story, Bakri ("Scapegoat"), has been adapted as 'kuri.com', in Kannada, by M.S.Sathyu, has been staged many times over the year, with revised adaptations, starting from the Emergency period (1975–77), when it was used as a political lampoon, it has also been presented as a folk play. His other noted plays are, Lakh Ki Naak, Hawalat and Bhaun Bhaun Khaun Khaun.
Sarveshwar Dayal Saxena even wrote Mukti ki Aakanksha that showed the
need of independency during his time.
One of his poems has been turned into an animation short, by Siddhartha
Pratap Singh, titled Apni Bitiya Ke Liye Ek Kavita.
 he also wrote 'Sham Ek Kishan'. He also wrote many children's poem of which Ibn batuta ka juta is the popular one. He edited the children's magazine Parag.

References

Bibliography
 People Hanging From Pegs by Sarveshwar Dayal Saxena, Tr. Kedar Nath Komal, 1991, Sahitya Akademi, .

Further reading
 New Poetry in Hindi: Nayi Kavita in Hindi: An Anthology, translated by Lucy Rosenstein, Wimbledon Publishing Company, 2004. .

Online works
Sarveshwar Dayal Saxena at Kavita Kosh 
Four Poems by Sarveshwar Dayal Saxena
 Suraj Ko Nahi Doobne Doonga, A Poem by Sarveshwar Dayal Saxena

External links
 Sarveshwar Dayal Saxena at Kavita Kosh 
 

 

1927 births
1983 deaths
People from Basti
Banaras Hindu University alumni
University of Allahabad alumni
Hindi-language writers
Hindi-language poets
Recipients of the Sahitya Akademi Award in Hindi
20th-century Indian poets
Indian male poets
Poets from Uttar Pradesh
A Poem Which was mostly found children hindi books are  - Mukti ki Akansha